Tecumseh High School was a high school in Franklin Furnace, Ohio.  It was a part of the Ohio River Valley Juvenile Correctional Facility.  All youth prisoners who did not have a high school degree were required to participate in the educational program.

The facility employed 333 staff until its closure on September 10, 2011.

References

External links
 Correctional Facility Website

High schools in Scioto County, Ohio
Public high schools in Ohio